The Asian Water Polo Clubs Championships are the premier Asian water polo club competitions run by the Asia Swimming Federation.

Summary

Titles by country

References
All Asian Club Results

International club water polo competitions
+
Recurring sporting events established in 1999